Franklin Historic District is a national historic district located at Franklin, Venango County, Pennsylvania.  The district includes 380 contributing buildings in the central business district and surrounding residential areas of Franklin.  It includes commercial, residential, industrial, and institutional buildings.  They are in a variety of popular architectural styles including Queen Anne, Greek Revival, and Federal.  Notable non-residential buildings include the Venango County Courthouse (1867, 1931–32), County Jail, and First United Methodist Church.

It was added to the National Register of Historic Places in 1984.

References

Historic districts on the National Register of Historic Places in Pennsylvania
Federal architecture in Pennsylvania
Queen Anne architecture in Pennsylvania
Greek Revival architecture in Pennsylvania
Buildings and structures in Venango County, Pennsylvania
National Register of Historic Places in Venango County, Pennsylvania